Vladimir Ivanovich Ivanov (27 August 1893 – 6 November 1938) was a Russian revolutionary and Soviet politician who served as the first First Secretary of the Communist Party of the Uzbek SSR from 1925 to 1927.

Biography 
Born into the family of a draftsman, Ivanov entered the Faculty of Medicine of the Imperial Moscow University in 1912. In 1915 he joined the Bolsheviks and participated in student demonstrations.

After the February Revolution he was secretary of the Khamovnichesky District Committee of the RSDLP (b) in Moscow. In 1917-1918 and during the October Revolution, he was a member of the Military Revolutionary Committee and the headquarters of the Red Guard of the Basmanny District and secretary of the Basmanny Russian Communist Party (b) of Moscow. From 1917 he was a member of the Presidium of the Moscow City Council and later the Moscow Committee of the RCP (b).

From September to November 1919, he was a member of the Revolutionary Military Council of the Fergana Front against the Basmachi movement in the Turkestan Autonomous Soviet Socialist Republic.

From May to October 1924 Ivanov was the chairman of the Moscow Control Commission of the RCP (b) and was head of the Moscow Workers' and Peasants' Inspection. He was a member of the Central Control Commission of the RCP (b) and a candidate member of the Presidium of the Central Control Commission of the RCP (b) from 1924 to 1925.

Ivanov served from 13 February 1925 until 1927 as the First Secretary of the Communist Party of Uzbekistan. His replacement was Kuprian Kirkizh. 

From 1927 to 1931 he was the second secretary of the North Caucasian Regional Committee of the All-Union Communist Party (b). From 1931 to 1937 he was the first secretary of the Northern Regional Committee of the VKP (b).

Ivanov was a Candidate member of the Central Committee of the VKP (b) from 1925 to 1934 and a member of the Central Committee of the VKP (b) from 1934 to 1937. 

From 1936 to 1937  he served as People's Commissar of the Timber Industry of the Soviet Union. 

During the Great Purge, he was put on the last of the Moscow Trials, the Trial of the Twenty-One, and subsequently executed. He was rehabilitated in 1959.

References 
 World Statesmen - Uzbekistan

1893 births
1938 deaths
People from Tula, Russia
People from Tula Governorate
Party leaders of the Soviet Union
Great Purge victims from Russia
Case of the Anti-Soviet "Bloc of Rightists and Trotskyites"
Heads of state of Uzbekistan
First Secretaries of the Communist Party of Uzbekistan
Soviet show trials
Russian revolutionaries
Old Bolsheviks
Central Committee of the Communist Party of the Soviet Union members
Central Committee of the Communist Party of the Soviet Union candidate members